Michael Patrick Williams (born 4 November 1991, in Bulawayo) is a Zimbabwean rugby player for Exeter Chiefs. He previously played for Leicester Tigers and Bath in Premiership Rugby and for Worcester Warriors in the RFU Championship. He plays primarily as a lock but he can also play at flanker.

In 2010 and 2011, he captained the Sharks at age-group level in South Africa before playing with Tuks and the Pretoria-based Blue Bulls in 2012 and 2013. He enjoyed an outstanding 2013 Varsity Cup campaign, winning man of the match in the semi-final against .

He moved to England to join Worcester Warriors on a two-year deal.
On 1 February 2015, Williams would leave Worcester for Premiership Rugby side Leicester Tigers from the 2015–2016 season.

On 18 January 2019, Williams would leave Leicester to join Premiership rivals Bath from the 2019-20 season.

Williams received his first call up to the senior England squad by coach Eddie Jones on 1 August 2016 for a pre-season training squad. On 30 September 2016 he was named in the Test squad for the Autumn Internationals. However he was subsequently ruled out of the Tests after breaking his arm.

References

Worcester Warriors players
Blue Bulls players
Sportspeople from Bulawayo
1991 births
Living people
Rugby union locks
Leicester Tigers players
Alumni of Christian Brothers College, Bulawayo